The 2021 ICC Women's T20 World Cup Africa Qualifier was a cricket tournament that was played in Botswana in September 2021. The matches were played as Women's Twenty20 Internationals (WT20Is), with the top team progressing to the 2022 ICC Women's T20 World Cup Qualifier tournament. Botswana, Cameroon and Eswatini made their debuts at an ICC women's event. Malawi were originally named as taking part in the tournament, but they were replaced by Eswatini.

Originally the tournament was scheduled to take place in October 2021, but was brought forward to ease fixture congestion. In July 2021, the dates for the Africa Qualifier were confirmed. The fixtures were reshuffled shortly before the tournament, following a member of the Cameroon squad recording a positive COVID-19 test. The entire squad was placed into isolation until they returned negative tests.

During Cameroon's opening match against Uganda, Maeva Douma dismissed four batters  by 'Mankading'. Namibia progressed to the semi-finals by winning all of their games to finish as winners of group B. Uganda joined them in the semi-finals as runners-up in the group. Zimbabwe topped group A with a 100% record to secure a semi-final against Uganda. Zimbabwe and Namibia won their respective semi-finals to advance to the final of the tournament. In the final, Zimbabwe beat Namibia by 13 runs to advance to the World Twenty20 Qualifier tournament, with Tanzania beating Uganda by nine wickets in the third place play-off match.

Squads
The following teams and squads were named for the tournament:

Group stage

Group A

Group B

Play-offs

1st Semi-final

2nd Semi-final

3rd place play-off

Final

References

External links
 Series home at ESPN Cricinfo

 
2021 in women's cricket
Associate international cricket competitions in 2021–22
2021 in Botswana sport
ICC